Akchoté is a surname and may refer to:
 Noël Akchoté (born 1968), French guitarist
 Sebastian Akchoté alias Sebastian (born 1981), French musician

See also
Axiotis

Surnames of Turkish origin
Jewish surnames